Mohammed Manga (born Richard Manga, 30 March 1977 - 27 September 2019) was a Senegalese football player.

Career 
The striker was born in Dakar, and started his career with Jeunesse amicale de Fass, before he signed at the end of the year 1993 with AS Douanes (Dakar). He started his senior career with the Dakar-based club under his birth name Richard Manga in 1994. Only a year later he left his club Douanes and signed with Tunisian side AS Djerba. He received the award for the best Goalscorer and moved in 1996 to League rival CS Hammam-Lif. He played the next two years with Hammam-Lif, before signing in 1998 in Saudi Arabia for Al-Ahli Jeddah. After a year in Jeddah he left the club and signed for Saudi Arabian second league side Sdoos Club. In 2003 he signed for Saudi Premier League club Al Shabab Riyadh and was the top scorer of the 2003/2004 Saudi League with 15 goals. After two years with Al Shabab FC Riyadh, he signed for Al Shabab Al Arabi Club in Dubai. In early 2007 he moved to Romania and signed for Politehnica Iaşi. He played for the club until summer 2007 and moved to Morocco to sign for Difaâ El Jadidi.

International 
Manga played in twelve games for the Senegal national football team and scored three goals for them.

Personal life 
Richard Manga converted in 2002 to Islam and changed his name from Richard Manga, to Mohamed Bachir. He played the last years of his career as Mohammad Bachir Manga.

Notes

1977 births
2019 deaths
Association football forwards
Senegalese footballers
Expatriate footballers in Tunisia
FC Politehnica Iași (1945) players
Expatriate footballers in Romania
Liga I players
Senegalese expatriate sportspeople in Romania
Difaâ Hassani El Jadidi players
Senegalese expatriate sportspeople in the United Arab Emirates
Al-Ahli Saudi FC players
Sdoos Club players
Al-Shabab FC (Riyadh) players
Expatriate footballers in Saudi Arabia
Al Shabab Al Arabi Club Dubai players
Expatriate footballers in the United Arab Emirates
AS Djerba players
CS Hammam-Lif players
Senegalese expatriate sportspeople in Saudi Arabia
AS Douanes (Senegal) players
Senegalese expatriate sportspeople in Tunisia
People from Dakar
Saudi Professional League players
Saudi First Division League players
UAE Pro League players